The 2014–15 Penn State Lady Lions basketball team will represent Pennsylvania State University during the 2014–15 NCAA Division I women's basketball season. The Lady Lions, led by eighth year head coach Coquese Washington, play their home games at the Bryce Jordan Center and were members of the Big Ten Conference. They finished the season 6–24, 3–15 in Big Ten play to finish in tie for thirteenth place. They lost in the first round of the Big Ten women's tournament to Indiana.

Roster

Schedule

|-
!colspan=9 style="background:#1C3C6B; color:white;"| Exhibition

|-
!colspan=9 style="background:#1C3C6B; color:white;"| Non-conference regular season

|-
!colspan=9 style="background:#1C3C6B; color:white;"| Big Ten regular season

|-
!colspan=9 style="background:#1C3C6B; color:white;"| Big Ten Women's Tournament

Source

Rankings

See also
2014–15 Penn State Nittany Lions basketball team

References

Penn State Lady Lions basketball seasons
Penn State